That Sunday Night Show is a British television chat show presented by Adrian Chiles and was first broadcast on ITV on 9 January 2011. Each episode was 30 minutes long.

In each episode, Chiles was joined by three guests who discussed the biggest news stories of the previous week and talked about the week ahead. They browsed newspapers, magazines, websites, blogs and social-networking sites for headline-grabbing events from the previous week.

ITV announced on 5 October 2012 that the show would not be commissioned for a fourth series due to poor ratings.

Episode list

Series 1

Series 2

Series 3

References

External links

2010s British comedy television series
2011 British television series debuts
2012 British television series endings
British television talk shows
ITV comedy
English-language television shows